Jung Hee Choi is a South Korean-born artist and musician, based in New York City, working in video, performance, sound and multi-media installation. Since 1999, Choi has been a disciple of La Monte Young and Marian Zazeela in the study of music and art. Choi, with Young and Zazeela, is a founding member of The Just Alap Raga Ensemble, and has performed as vocalist with the ensemble since 2002. 
Choi's work has been presented in the U.S., Europe and Asia, including FRAC Franche-Comté, France; Berliner Festspiele, Germany; Dia Art Foundation, Guggenheim Museum and MELA Foundation Dream Houses, NYC; FRESH Festival, Bangkok; and the Korea Experimental Arts Festival, Korea. The New York Times listed Choi’s Tonecycle for Blues performed by her Sundara All Star Band as one of The Best Classical Music Performances of 2017.

Work
Choi’s electroacoustic and modal improvisation ensemble, Sundara All Star Band was premiered in 2015 performing her Tonecycle for Blues Base 30 Hz, 2:3:7 Ensemble Version with 4:3 and 7:6 at Dia 15 VI 13 545 West 22 Street Dream House, Dia Art Foundation, New York. The members include La Monte Young, Marian Zazeela, Jung Hee Choi, voices; Jon Catler, fretless guitar; Brad Catler, Hansford Rowe, fretless bass and Naren Budhkar, tabla. The New York Times listed Choi’s Tonecycle for Bluesas one of The Best Classical Music Performances of 2017, “Heard in its latest iteration, this October, the deep groove of the work’s slow-tempo ‘ektal vilampit’ section had a unique majesty. Heaving funk progressions from a fretless [guitar and] bass mingled with tabla percussion and sustained vocal tones of pristine calm.”

Choi has presented series of environmental compositions with video, evolving light-point patterns, drawing, incense, performance and sound involving the concept of “Manifest, Unmanifest”. She describes the work as a “synthesis of expression" that "collectively creates an intersubjective space as a unified continuum and emphasizes the totality of sense perceptions as a single unit to create a state of immersion.”
The New York Times described her environmental composition, Ahata Anahata, Manifest Unmanifest IX at Dia 15 VI 13 545 West 22 Street Dream House, as a work wherein,

Selected exhibitions and performances
2015	
Pandit Pran Nath 97th Birthday Memorial Tribute, Three Evening Concerts of Raga Darbari,November 6, 14 and 20, 2015; The Just Alap Raga Ensemble, La Monte Young, Marian Zazeela,Jung Hee Choi, voices; Naren Budhkar, tabla.  MELA Foundation Dream House, New York
Tonecycle for Blues Base 30 Hz, 2:3:7 Ensemble Version with 4:3 and 7:6, World premiere liveperformances, October 15 and 23, 2015, The Sundara All-Star Band; La Monte Young, MarianZazeela, Jung Hee Choi, voices; Jon Catler, fretless guitar; Brad Catler, fretless bass; NarenBudhkar, table, La Monte Young  Marian Zazeela  Jung Hee Choi Dia 15 VI 13 545 West 22Street Dream House, Dia Art Foundation, New York
Ahata Anahata, Manifest Unmanifest IX, multimedia installations: Light Point Drawings No. 19,20, 21 and 22; mixed media: black wrap with pinholes, translucent paper, and video; 23 ft x 14 ft.Sound Environment, TONECYCLE BASE 30 HZ, 2:3:7, The Linear Superposition Of 77 SineWave Frequencies Set In Ratios Based On The Harmonics 2, 3 And 7 Imperceptibly AscendingToward Fixed Frequencies And Then Descending Toward The Starting Frequencies, InfinitelyRevolving As In Circles, In Parallel And Various Rates Of Similar Motion To Create ContinuousSlow Phase Shift With Long Beat Cycles; June 13, 2015 to October 24, 2015; La Monte YoungMarian Zazeela  Jung Hee Choi Dia 15 VI 13 545 West 22 Street Dream House, Dia ArtFoundation, New York
Pandit Pran Nath 19th Anniversary Memorial Tribute, Three Evening Concerts of Raga Darbari,June 13, 19 and 27, 2015; The Just Alap Raga Ensemble, La Monte Young, Marian Zazeela,Jung Hee Choi, voices; Naren Budhkar, tabla. Dia 15 VI 13 545 West 22 Street Dream House,Dia Art Foundation, New York
2014	
Pandit Pran Nath 96th Birthday Memorial Tribute, Three Evening Concerts of Raga Darbari,November 1, 8 and 15, 2014; The Just Alap Raga Ensemble, La Monte Young, Marian Zazeela,Jung Hee Choi, voices; Naren Budhkar, tabla.  MELA Foundation Dream House, New York		
Tonecycle Base 30 Hz, 2:3:7 Vocal Version with 4:3 and 7:6, live performances in the setting ofAhata Anahata, Manifest Unmanifest VIII; September 13 and 20, 2014; La Monte Young, MarianZazeela, Jung Hee Choi, voices, sine wave frequencies. MELA Foundation Dream House, NewYork
Ahata Anahata, Manifest Unmanifest VIII, multimedia installations: video, drawing, sound,incense, 3D sound installation; Solo exhibition; August 21- September 20, 2014; MELAFoundation Dream House, New York		
Pandit Pran Nath 18th Anniversary Memorial Tribute, Three Evening Concerts of Raga Darbari,June 7, 12 and 21, 2014; The Just Alap Raga Ensemble, La Monte Young, Marian Zazeela,Jung Hee Choi, voices; Naren Budhkar, tabla.  MELA Foundation Dream House, New York
2013
Ahata Anahata, Manifest Unmanifest VII, multimedia installations: video, drawing, soundSolo exhibition, August 15- September 14, 2013; MELA Foundation Dream House, New York
A Raga Lesson, Film, 16mm, color, sound, 12 minutesAugust 13 – 22, 2013; Thinking MEDIA III; Chungmu Art Hall Gallery, Seoul, Korea
Pandit Pran Nath 17th Anniversary Memorial Tribute, Three Evening Concerts of Raga Darbari,June 1, 8 and 15, 2013; The Just Alap Raga Ensemble, La Monte Young, Marian Zazeela,Jung Hee Choi, voices; Naren Budhkar, tabla. MELA Foundation Dream House, New York
Environmental Composition 2011 #2, (Light Point Drawings #5 & #6, RWV for LPD v.2,Tonecycle Base 60 Hz, 2:3:7 Vocal Version), multimedia installation: video, drawing, sound;6 April – 25 August 2013, Des Mondes Possibles, FRAC Franche-Comté Cité des Arts, France
2012
Pandit Pran Nath 94th Birthday Memorial Tribute, Three Evening Concerts of Raga Darbari,November 3, 10, 17, 2012; The Just Alap Raga Ensemble, La Monte Young, Marian Zazeela,Jung Hee Choi, voices; Naren Budhkar, tabla. MELA Foundation Dream House, New York
Tonecycle Base 30 Hz, 2:3:7 Vocal Version, live performances in the setting of Ahata Anahata,Manifest Unmanifest VI; September 8, 15, 2012; La Monte Young, Marian Zazeela, Jung HeeChoi, voices, sine wave frequencies. MELA Foundation Dream House, New York
Ahata Anahata, Manifest Unmanifest VI, multimedia installations: video, drawing, soundSolo exhibition, August 23 – September 15, 2012, MELA Foundation Dream House, New York
Pandit Pran Nath 16th Anniversary Memorial Tribute, Three Evening Concerts of Raga Darbari,June 16, 23, 30, 2012; The Just Alap Raga Ensemble, La Monte Young, Marian Zazeela, JungHee Choi, voices; Naren Budhkar, tabla. MELA Foundation Dream House, New York
Environmental Composition 2012 #1(Light Point Drawings #7 & #8, RWV for LPD, TonecycleBase 60 Hz, 2:3:7 Vocal Version), multimedia installation: video, drawing, sound; March 19 –April 1, 2012; MaerzMusik/Berliner Festspiele, Villa Elisabeth, Berlin, Germany
Pandit Pran Nath Memorial Tribute Tour, Five Evening Concerts of Raga Darbari,The Just Alap Raga Ensemble, La Monte Young, Marian Zazeela, Jung Hee Choi, voices; NarenBudhkar, tabla; MaerzMusik/Berliner Festspiele, Berlin, Germany; March 19, 24, 31, 2012ZKM, Karlsruhe, Germany; April 7, 2012Kunst im Regenbogenstadl, Polling, Germany; April 14, 2012
2011
Ahata Anahata, Manifest Unmanifest V, Environmental Composition 2011 #2 (Light PointDrawing #5, Light Point Drawing #6, RWV for LPD) Tonecycle Base 65 Hz, 2:3:7; RICE; AUM(incense calligraphy); Color (CNN), multimedia installations: video, drawing, sound, and liveperformance; December 6, 2011 – January 20, 2012;Resonant Bodies, ERBA de Besançon, France
Pandit Pran Nath 93rd Birthday Memorial Tribute, Three Evening Concerts of Raga Darbari,October 29, November 6, 13, 2011. The Just Alap Raga Ensemble, La Monte Young, MarianZazeela, Jung Hee Choi, voices; Naren Budhkar, tabla. MELA Foundation Dream House, New York
Tonecycle Base 65 Hz, 2:3:7 Vocal Version, live performances; September 3, 10, 2011;La Monte Young, Marian Zazeela, Jung Hee Choi, voices, sine wave frequencies. MELAFoundation Dream House, New York
Ahata Anahata, Manifest Unmanifest IV, Environmental Composition 2011 #1 (Light PointDrawings #3, #4, #5 and #6, RWV for LPD); Tonecycle Base 65 Hz, 2:3:7 Vocal Version; RICE;Composition 2006 #3 (Spirit); AUM (incense calligraphy); Color (CNN); Composition BD 2011#1; Composition BD 2011 #2, multimedia installations: video, drawing, sound; August 25 –September 17, 2011. Solo exhibition, MELA Foundation Dream House, New York
Color (CNN) w. Tonecycle Base 65 Hz, 2:3:7, a video sound installation; June 9–10, 2011;GLOCAL Media Art Festival, Chungju, Korea
Pandit Pran Nath 15th Anniversary Memorial Tribute, Three Evening Concerts of Raga Darbari,June 11, 18, 25, 2011; The Just Alap Raga Ensemble, La Monte Young, Marian Zazeela, JungHee Choi, voices; Naren Budhkar, tabla. MELA Foundation Dream House, New York
2010
Pandit Pran Nath 92nd Birthday Memorial Tribute, Two Concerts of Evening Ragas, November 6,13, 2010; The Just Alap Raga Ensemble, La Monte Young, Marian Zazeela, Jung Hee Choi,voices; Naren Budhkar, tabla. MELA Foundation Dream House, New York
Environmental Composition 2010 II (Rice; Tonecycle Base 65 Hz, 2:3:7), multimedia installation:video, sound; September 11–18, 2010; One and Three Quarters of an Inch, St. Cecilia’s Convent,New York
Ahata Anahata, Manifest Unmanifest III, Environmental Composition 2010 #1 (Light PointDrawings #3 & #4, RWV for LPD); Tonecycle Base 65 Hz, 2:3:7; RICE; Composition 2006 #3(Spirit); AUM (incense calligraphy); Color (CNN); Composition BD 2008 #1; Composition BD2008 #2; Composition BD 2008 #4; Composition BD 2008 #5; Composition BD 2006 #2,multimedia installations: video, drawing, sound; August 21 – September 11, 2010. Soloexhibition, MELA Foundation Dream House, New York
AUM, a video sound installation;BITT Festival for the Arts, June 3 – 30, 2010; Konkuk Media Art Center, Chungju, Korea andGallery Artrang, Seoul, Korea
Room with a View v.2, a video sound installation9th Korea Experimental Arts Festival, July 24 - August 1, 2010; Seoul Art Space Seogyo, Seoul,Korea
Pandit Pran Nath 14th Anniversary Memorial Tribute, Two Concerts of Evening Ragas, June 12,19, 2010; The Just Alap Raga Ensemble, La Monte Young, Marian Zazeela, Jung Hee Choi,voices; Naren Budhkar, tabla. MELA Foundation Dream House, New York
2009
Environmental Composition 2008 #1 (Spirit, Tonecycle Base 65 Hz, 2:3:7), multimediainstallation: video, soundFaces & Facts: Korean Contemporary Art in New York, Celebrating the 30th Anniversary ofKorean Cultural Service; December 10, 2009 – February 19, 2010; Sylvia Wald and Po Kim ArtGallery, New York
Maha Mrityunjaya Mantra in Raga Sindh Bhairavi, live performance; October 28, 2009; The JustAlap Raga Ensemble, La Monte Young, Marian Zazeela, Jung Hee Choi, voices; Merce CunninghamMemorial, Park Avenue Armory, New York
RICE abstract version, a video sound installationFRESH 2009 Festival of International Video Art and Short Films, December 18–20, 2009; CODE,Bangkok
Room with a View, a video sound installation8th Korea Experimental Arts Festival, September 2009; Seoul, Korea
Pandit Pran Nath 91st Birthday Memorial Tribute, Two Concerts of Evening Ragas, November 13,20, 2009;The Just Alap Raga Ensemble, La Monte Young, Marian Zazeela, Jung Hee Choi, voices; NarenBudhkar, tabla. MELA Foundation Dream House, New York
Ahata Anahata, Manifest Unmanifest II, Environmental Composition 2009 #1 (Light PointDrawings #1 & #2, WP for LPD); Tonecycle Base 65 Hz, 2:3:7; RICE; Composition 2006 #3(Spirit); AUM (incense calligraphy); Color (CNN); Composition BD 2008 #1; Composition BD2008 #2; Composition BD 2008 #4; Composition BD 2008 #5; Composition BD 2006 #2,multimedia installations: video, drawing, soundSolo exhibition, August 29 – September 19, 2009; MELA Foundation Dream House, New York
ACAW Artists Portfolio 2009, online presentation, May 10 – 18, 2009; Contemporary Art Weekorganized by Asia Society, New York
RICE, video sound installation and live performance, March 28, 2009; Dream House in The ThirdMind exhibition, Guggenheim Museum, New York
Tribute to Pandit Pran Nath, Two Evening Raga Concerts, March 14, 21, 2009; Raga Sundara,ektal vilampit khayal set in Raga Yaman Kalyan, live performances; The Just Alap RagaEnsemble, La Monte Young, Marian Zazeela, Jung Hee Choi, Da’ud Constant, voices; Jon Catler,electric sustainer guitar; Charles Curtis, cello; Naren Budhkar, tabla. Dream Housein The Third Mind exhibition, Guggenheim Museum, New York
2008
Jung Hee Choi Drawings, Video and Sound InstallationScope/Art Asia, December 2–6, 2008; Miami
Jung Hee Choi Drawings, Video and Sound Installation; November 7 – 10, 2008. AsianContemporary Art Fair New York, New York
Pandit Pran Nath 12th Anniversary Memorial Tribute, Two Evening Raga Concerts, June 20, 27,2008; Raga Sundara, ektal vilampit khayal set in Raga Yaman Kalyan, live performances; TheJust Alap Raga Ensemble, La Monte Young, Marian Zazeela, Jung Hee Choi, Da’ud Constant,voices; Jon Catler, electric sustainer guitar; Charles Curtis, cello; Naren Budhkar, tabla.MELA Foundation Dream House, New York
Room with a View, a video sound installation,Chuncheon International Mime Festival, May 2008; Chuncheon, Korea
Tribute to Ustad Abdul Wahid Khan Sahib, Two Evening Raga Concerts, February 8, 15, 2008;Raga Sundara, ektal vilampit khayal set in Raga Yaman Kalyan; The Just Alap Raga Ensemble,La Monte Young, Marian Zazeela, Jung Hee Choi, Da’ud Constant, voices; Jon Catler, electricsustainer guitar; Naren Budhkar, tabla. MELA Foundation Dream House, New York
2007
Baby Blues, 16mm filmFRESH 2007 Festival of International Video Art and Short Films, December 2007, CODE,Bangkok
Composition 2007 #2 based on the scale of Yaman, video & live performance in collaborationwith Jon Catler; Monkey Town, New York
RICE, a video sound installationChuncheon International Mime Festival, June 2007; Chuncheon, Korea
Pandit Pran Nath 11th Anniversary Memorial Concerts, June 29, July 6, 2007; Raga Sundara,ektal vilampit khayal set in Raga Yaman Kalyan, live performances; The Just Alap RagaEnsemble, La Monte Young, Marian Zazeela, Jung Hee Choi, Da’ud Constant, voices; Jon Catler,electric sustainer guitar; Charles Curtis, cello; Naren Budhkar, tabla. MELA Foundation DreamHouse, New York
Ahata Anahata, The manifest The unmanifest, As a wheel that is one-rimmed and threefold withone-hundred and one spokes and where the illusion of the one springs from the other two,Composition 2006 #3 (Spirit); Composition 2006 #4 (Dragon); Composition in the style of LaMonte Young’s 1960 sustained friction sounds, multimedia installations: video, sound, drawing;April 11 – 28, 2007. Solo exhibition, Tompkins Square Gallery, New York
Tribute to Ustad Abdul Wahid Khan Sahib – Two Concerts in the Dream House; January 6, 13,2007; Raga Sundara, ektal vilampit khayal set in Raga Yaman Kalyan, live performances; TheJust Alap Raga Ensemble, La Monte Young, Marian Zazeela, Jung Hee Choi, Da’ud Constant,voices; Jon Catler, electric sustainer guitar; Naren Budhkar, tabla. MELA Foundation DreamHouse, New York
2006
Composition 2006 #2, 16 states of experience, multimedia installations: video, soundEcologus-Perspectives on an Imperiled Habitat, February 19 – March 3, 2007; Loft 36, New York
Environmental Composition 2006 #3 (Room with a View, Fifth) multimedia installation: video,sound; October 12, 2006; MetroSpacial, Dupoux Design, New York
Pandit Pran Nath 10th Anniversary Memorial Concert, June 17, 24, 2006; Raga Sundara, ektalvilampit khayal set in Raga Yaman Kalyan, live performances; The Just Alap Raga Ensemble, La Monte Young, Marian Zazeela, Jung Hee Choi, Da’ud Constant, voices; Jon Catler, electricsustainer guitar; Naren Budhkar, tabla. MELA Foundation Dream House, New York
2005
RICE, video sound installation and live performance, Composition in the style of La MonteYoung’s 1960 sustained friction sounds; performance, November 9, 2005; installation, November11 – 25, 2005;La Monte Young 70th Birthday Celebration, MELA Foundation Dream House, New York
RICE, video sound telecast; November 11, 2005; La Monte Young 70th Birthday Celebration.Television Art/Mantra TV, MNN, New York
Tribute to Ustad Abdul Wahid Khan Sahib, Raga Sundara, ektal vilampit khayal set in RagaYaman Kalyan, live performance, November 5, 2005; The Just Alap Raga Ensemble, La MonteYoung, Marian Zazeela, Jung Hee Choi, Da’ud Constant, voices; Rose Okada, sarangi; NarenBudhkar, tabla; La Monte Young 70th Birthday Celebration. MELA Foundation Dream House,New York
Tribute to Abdul Wahid Khan, Raga Sundara, ektal vilampit khayal set in RagaYaman Kalyan, live performance, February 5, 2005; The Just Alap Raga Ensemble, La MonteYoung, Marian Zazeela, Jung Hee Choi, Da’ud Constant, voices; Rose Okada, sarangi; CharlesCurtis, cello; Naren Budhkar, tabla. MELA Foundation Dream House, New York
2004
Pandit Pran Nath 86th Birthday Memorial Tribute, November 6, 2004; The Just Alap RagaEnsemble, La Monte Young, Marian Zazeela, Jung Hee Choi, Da’ud Constant, voices; NarenBudhkar, tabla. MELA Foundation Dream House, New York
Memorial Tribute to Pandit Pran Nath and Ustad Hafizullah Khan; Avant Premiere, RagaSundara, ektal vilampit khayal set in Raga Yaman Kalyan, live performance, July 24, 2004; TheJust Alap Raga Ensemble, La Monte Young, Marian Zazeela, Jung Hee Choi, Da’ud Constant,voices; Charles Curtis, cello; Naren Budhkar, tabla. MELA Foundation Dream House, New York
2003
In Memoriam Pandit Pran Nath, Raga Yaman Kalyan, Raga Sindh Bhairavi, live performance,June 12, 2003;The Just Alap Raga Ensemble, La Monte Young, Marian Zazeela, Jung Hee Choi, voices; RoseOkada, sarangi; Tzara Vierck, tabla. MELA Foundation Dream House, New York
RICE, a video sound installation and live performance, Composition in the style of La MonteYoung’s 1960 sustained friction sounds, live performance, Sunday, May 4, 2003; installation,Fridays, May 9 – June 20, 2003. MELA Foundation Dream House, New York
RICE, a video sound installationEwha University Media Art Festival, Seoul, Korea
RICE, a video sound telecastTelevision Art/Mantra TV, MNN, New York
2002
Pandit Pran Nath 84th Birthday Memorial Concert, live performance, Sunday, November 2, 2002;The Just Alap Raga Ensemble, La Monte Young, Marian Zazeela, Jung Hee Choi, voices; RoseOkada, sarangi; Brad Catler, tabla. MELA Foundation Dream House, New York
One Comprehends Plethora, Plethora Comprehends One, video performance, collaboration withCharles CurtisKunst im Regenbogenstadl, Polling, Germany
A Concert in Memory of Ustad Hafizullah Khan, Raga Darbari, Raga Bhairavi, liveperformance, Thursday, August 22, 2002; The Just Alap Raga Ensemble, La Monte Young,Marian Zazeela, Jung Hee Choi, voices; Brad Catler, tabla. MELA Foundation Dream House, New York
RICE, multimedia installations: sculpture, video, sounds; March 2 – 17, 2002;Solo Exhibition, Open Gallery, New York
2001
A Mixt Event: Jung Hee Choi Two Video Installations, One Comprehends Plethora, PlethoraComprehends One; Sleep, video installations, sound: Charles CurtisDiapason Sound and Intermedia Gallery, New York
Sleep, video sound telecast, sound: Charles CurtisTelevision Art/Mantra TV, MNN, New York
2000
One Comprehends Plethora, Plethora Comprehends One, collaboration with Charles Curtis andDonald Miller, video sound performanceVespers 03, Amphitheater, New York
Sumptuous Bars; Butterflies, Sleep, video performances, collaboration with Michael J.Schumacher and Ursula Scherrer; video sound performance. Gale Gates et al., New York
One Comprehends Plethora, Plethora Comprehends One, collaboration with Charles Curtis,video sound performance. Gallery Hinterconti, Hamburg, Germany
Sumptuous Bars, video telecast, sound: Charles Curtis; Television Art, MNN, New York
Nuclear, performance art; Space Untitled, New York

Exhibition curator and co-curator
2013
Thinking MEDIA IIIAugust 13 – 22, 2013; Chungmu Art Hall Gallery, Seoul, Korea
2011
Glocal Media Art Festival, International ProgramJune 9–10, 2011; Konkuk University Glocal Campus, Chungju, Korea
2010
9th Korea Experimental Arts Festival, film and video programSeoul Art Space: Seogyo, Seoul, Korea
Two Mobile Theaters, Seoul, KoreaTheater Zero, Seoul, Korea
BITT 2010 Festival for the ArtsArtrang Gallery, Seoul, Korea
2009
The Third Annual KU Exhibition of International Professors (USA)Gallery THE, Seoul, Korea
ADFUL: International Exhibition of the University Students 2009 (USA)Gallery of the Korea Advertising Cultural Center, Seoul, Korea
2008
The Second Annual KU Exhibition of International Professors (USA)Gallery of the Korea Advertising Cultural Center, Seoul, Korea
ADFUL: International Exhibition of the University Students 2008 (USA)Gallery of the Korea Advertising Cultural Center, Seoul, Korea
2007
KU Exhibition of International Professors (USA)Gallery of the Korea Advertising Cultural Center, Seoul, Korea
2006
Syn-Aesthetics, the Media Mavericks 1st Experimental Film Festival,New York University, New York
\

Honors, grants, and commissions
2015
Project Grants Award, New Music USA, New York
Commission, MELA Foundation, New York
2012
SIFF Performance Thesis Grant, New York University, New York
2010-2012
Grant, Contemporary Art Week, New York
2007
Honor, Summa Cum Laude, New York University
2006
Grant, Experimental Television Center, Finishing Fund, New York
2005
Commission, MELA Foundation, New York
2003
Commission, MELA Foundation, New York
Honor, The 10 Best of 2003, Artforum, New York

Collections
2015
Ahata Anahata, Manifest Unmanifest IX; Light Point Drawings #19, #20, #21 and #22; RWV forLPD v.2; Sound Environment, TONECYCLE BASE 30 HZ, 2:3:7, The Linear Superposition Of77 Sine Wave Frequencies Set In Ratios Based On The Harmonics 2, 3 And 7 ImperceptiblyAscending Toward Fixed Frequencies And Then Descending Toward The Starting Frequencies,Infinitely Revolving As In Circles, In Parallel And Various Rates Of Similar Motion To CreateContinuous Slow Phase Shift With Long Beat Cycles; La Monte Young  Marian Zazeela  JungHee Choi Dia 15 VI 13 545 West 22 Street Dream House, Dia Art Foundation, New York
2013
Environmental Composition 2011 #2; Light Point Drawings #5 and #6, RWV for LPD v.2,Tonecycle Base 60 Hz, 2:3:7 Vocal Version; FRAC Franche-Comté Cité des Arts, France
2012
Composition LPD 2012 #1 one of two (Heike), Light Point Drawing on Black Wrap
Composition LPD 2012 #1 two of two (Heiner), Light Point Drawing on Black Wrap
2011
Composition EP 2011 #3, Etching, silver print on black paper, edition of 7
2010
Composition BD 2009 #4, Pencil on Black Paper
Composition BD 2009 #3, Pencil on Black Paper
2006
A Spirit, Pencil on Black Paper
2000
Transition, Rubber & Design Cast Sculpture

Instructor and lecturer
2011
Le Quai, Ecole Supérieure d'Art de Mulhouse, France
2010
School of Visual Art, New York
2008–present
The Kirana Center for Indian Classical Music, North Indian Raga, New York

References

South Korean women artists
South Korean artists
South Korean musicians
Living people
American people of South Korean descent
American people of Korean descent
Year of birth missing (living people)